Katherina Wakile (née Pierri; born October 4, 1965) is an American reality television personality. She starred in the Bravo series The Real Housewives of New Jersey, which features the lives of her and her family members.

Early life
Wakile was born October 4, 1965 in New Jersey. She has a younger sister, Rosie, and three brothers.

Wakile resides in Franklin Lakes, New Jersey with her husband of over 20 years, Richard Wakile, an owner/operator of NJ gas stations, and their two children, Victoria (b. 1994) and Joseph (b. 1996). Kathy and Victoria frequently participate in events that raise awareness for brain cancer, an illness they take close to heart, as Victoria underwent two operations to remove a benign brain tumor.

Career
Wakile joined the show's third season in May 2011. She was put in the middle of confrontations between her cousin, Teresa Giudice and her cousin-in-law, Melissa Gorga. The show mainly shows how Wakile deals with her kids' growing up, daughter’s health issues, and her wish to open a restaurant one day. In Season 3, Wakile feuded with Cousin, Teresa and also had difficulties getting to know Caroline Manzo due to the latter’s allegiances with the former. In Season 4, Wakile still argues with Teresa. Her sister, Rosie, who is gay, has also been featured on the show and gained a following due to her story of being different and coming out. Wakile also appeared in the fifth season of the show and this season saw the repair of many friendships including the relationship between Wakile and Teresa.  In May 2014, it was announced Wakile would not return for the series’ sixth season, but would make periodic appearances throughout. She was credited as a ‘Friend of the Housewives’ for the show’s seventh season too.

Aside from appearing on the series, she has introduced three product lines since joining the show, including Dolci Della Dea, which includes a cannoli kit, Goddess Eye Jewelry, a jewelry line which gives portion of the sales to the National Brain Tumor Society, and Red Velvet Cosmo, a ready-to-pour cocktail. Red Velvet Cosmo is based on one of her favorite desserts, red velvet cake. The drink won a medal in a national tasting competition. Wakile has also written a cookbook Indulge: Delicious Little Desserts That Keep Life Real Sweet.

In May 2017,  Wakile announced she would be opening up a restaurant in Bergen County, New Jersey, alongside her husband Rich.  Titled Pizza Love, it will specialize in pizza, Italian and Mediterranean food, as well as desserts. It opened in September 2017.

Bibliography
Indulge: Delicious Little Desserts That Keep Life Real Sweet (St. Martin's Griffin, September 2, 2014) 978-1-250-05126-4

References

External links
 
 

1965 births
Living people
People from Wayne, New Jersey
The Real Housewives cast members
American cookbook writers
American women restaurateurs
American restaurateurs
American women in business
21st-century American women